Pleasant Hill is an unincorporated community in Garland County, Arkansas, United States.

References

Unincorporated communities in Garland County, Arkansas
Unincorporated communities in Arkansas